Titlis is a mountain of the Uri Alps, located on the border between the cantons of Obwalden and Bern. It is mainly accessed from Engelberg (OW) on the north side and is famous as the site of the world's first rotating cable car. The cable car system connects Engelberg to the summit of Klein Titlis through the three stages of Gerschnialp, Trübsee and Stand. In 2016, a direct route was created that bypassed Geraschnialp, going directly to Trübsee.  

The last part of cable car leads above the glacier. At Klein Titlis, it is possible to visit an illuminated glacier cave from an entrance within the cable-car station, which also includes shops and restaurants. The Titlis Cliff Walk, the highest elevation suspension bridge in Europe, opened in December 2012, giving views across the Alps. Many people use Titlis as a cheaper and easier option than Jungfraujoch.

Geography

Titlis straddles the border between Obwalden and Bern. The main summit of Titlis (sometimes distinguished by the name Gross Titlis) and Klein Titlis are both located between the municipalities of Engelberg on the north and Gadmen on the south. The Titlis massif is also partially located in Nidwalden, where the highest point of that canton is found: the Rotstöckli (2,901 m). Titlis itself is the highest point in Obwalden and in the valley of Engelberg. East of Titlis is the Grassen, where the borders between the cantons of Obwalden, Berne and Uri converge. The geographical center of Switzerland is situated about 15 kilometers west of the mountain.

Titlis is the highest mountain in the portion of the Uri Alps north of the Susten Pass. This part of the range is located between the valleys of the Hasli (west) and the Reuss (east), thus separating the waters feeding the basins of the Aare and Reuss respectively. On the north side, the valley of Engelberg (Engelbergertal) is drained by the Engelberger Aa, a tributary of the Lake Lucerne. The valley is located southwards from Lake Lucerne.

The northern side of the massif is covered by the Titlis Glacier. Due to the global warming the glacier has been receded dramatically; it is expected to disappear in about twenty years. The south steep and rocky face rises above the Wenden Glacier. The east side overlooks a glacier named Firnalpeligletscher.

History
In earlier times, Titlis was known under the names Wendenstock or Nollen. The Reissend Nollen and the Wendenstöcke are the nearest western neighbours to the mountain, slightly lower than Titlis, but with sharp rugged peaks. In a document of 1435 the mountain is called Tuttelsberg (Tutilos mountain), referencing to a man named Tutilos, who was probably a local farmer. The name, from Tutilos Berg, became Titlisberg and later Titlis.

The first ascent of Titlis was probably made in the year 1739. It was done by Ignaz Hess, J. E. Waser and two other men from Engelberg. The first written evidence of an ascent is found in the Engelberger Dokumente. They mention a party of four men that reached the summit in 1744.

On 21 January 1904 the first ski ascent of Titlis was made by Joseph Kuster and Willi Amrhein.

In March 1967 the cable car to Klein Titlis (3,032 m) was inaugurated.

In December 2012, the Titlis Cliff Walk opened to commemorate the 110th anniversary of the Engelberg-Gerschnialp cableway.

Telecommunications 
Klein Titlis hosts a significant telecommunications site, used for high capacity point-to-point microwave radio links and VHF/UHF repeaters. Licensed band radio links are regulated by the Swiss Federal Office of Communications.

Weather
The summit of Titlis is located above the snow line, thus it has a cold, snowy climate with permanent snow cover and freezing temperatures.

Gallery

See also
List of mountains of Switzerland

References

 Swisstopo maps

External links

 Titlis webpage on the Swiss national tourist office
 Titlis Tourism homepage

Mountains of Switzerland
Mountains of the Alps
Alpine three-thousanders
Tourist attractions in Switzerland
Cable cars in Switzerland
Highest points of Swiss cantons
Engelberg
Mountains of Obwalden
Mountains of the canton of Bern
Bern–Obwalden border